The Dutch Football League is organized by the Royal Dutch Football Association (KNVB, Koninklijke Nederlandse Voetbalbond).The most successful teams are Ajax (35), PSV (23) and Feyenoord (15). Important teams of the past are HVV (10 titles), Sparta Rotterdam (6 titles) and Willem II (3 titles).

The annual match that marks the beginning of the season is called the Johan Cruijff Schaal (Johan Cruyff Shield). Contenders are the champions and the cup winners of the previous season.

Dutch professional clubs

Former Dutch league teams 

 Koninklijke HFC
 AVV RAP (of Amsterdam) were the first official champions of the Netherlands in 1899. The club however became a Cricket club in 1916 following a total of 5 national football titles. 
 Fortuna 54 (of Geleen) and Sittardia (of Sittard) merged to form Fortuna Sittard in 1968.
 Blauw Wit, DWS and De Volewijckers merged to form FC Amsterdam in 1972, which ceased to exist in 1982.
 PEC and the Zwolsche Boys merged to form PEC Zwolle in 1971, which became FC Zwolle in 1990.
 Sportclub Enschede and the Enschedese Boys merged to form FC Twente in 1965.
 DOS, Elinkwijk and Velox merged to form FC Utrecht in 1970.
 GVAV became FC Groningen in 1971.
 Alkmaar 54 and FC Zaanstreek merged to form AZ in 1967.
 Roda Sport and Rapid JC merged to form Roda JC in 1962.
 BVC Rotterdam and BVC Flamingos merged to form Scheveningen Holland Sport in 1954, which merged with ADO in 1971 to form FC Den Haag, and became ADO Den Haag in 1996.
 SVV and Dordrecht '90 merged to form SVV/Dordrecht '90 in 1991. The club has since been renamed FC Dordrecht.
 VC Vlissingen (from Flushing) became a professional club in 1990, changed its name to VCV Zeeland a year later, and became an amateur club again in 1992. 
 FC Wageningen (founded in 1911) won the Dutch cup in 1939 and 1948, joined the Dutch professional league when it was formed in 1954, and remained professional until the club went bankrupt in 1992.
 HVC of Amersfoort was formed in 1905, joined the league in 1954, was renamed to SC Amersfoort in 1973 and went bankrupt in 1982.
 Fortuna Vlaardingen (formed in 1904) joined the professional league in 1955, was renamed to FC Vlaardingen in 1974 and went bankrupt in 1981.
 HFC Haarlem (formed in 1889) joined the professional league in 1954 and remained professional until the club went bankrupt in 2010.
 RBC Roosendaal (formed in 1927) joined the professional league in 1955 till 1971 and 1983 and remained professional until the club went bankrupt in 2011.
 AGOVV Apeldoorn (formed in 1913) joined the professional league in 1954 till 1971, returned to professional soccer on 1 July 2003, and went bankrupt in 2013. 
 SC Veendam (formed in 1894) joined the professional league in 1954, and went bankrupt in 2013.
 Zwart-Wit '28 won the national amateur championship in 1971 and the national cup for women in 2000. Went bankrupt in 2004.

See also

 Eerste Divisie
 Eredivisie
 List of football stadiums in the Netherlands

References

External links 
 Midfield Dynamo's list of the Dutch football league's 'Big 3' and 'Best of the Rest' of the other clubs, midfielddynamo.com
  Orange Football Blog - Weekly summaries from the Eredivisie and other articles, nlplanet.com
  Official Eredivisie site
  Official Eerste Divisie website
 League321.com - Club stats records.

 
Netherlands
Clubs
Football clubs

ja:エールディヴィジ